Caesar is an unincorporated community in Bee County, in the U.S. state of Texas. It is located within the Beeville micropolitan area.

History
Caesar was originally named Wolfe's Neighborhood after local settler Peter Wolfe, who came to the area sometime before 1876. A post office was established at Caesar in 1903 and remained in operation until sometime after 1930. R.L. Peevy built and operated a store in the community and applied for the post office at the start of the 20th century. He then sent postal authorities some potential names from the Bible and chose the name, Caesar. It had a church, a store, and only 15 residents in 1914. The discovery of gas and oil in the area did not convince any of its original settlers to sell any parts of their land to newcomers. As a result, there were no businesses or residents by the late 1980s.

The Pullin-Livingston Cemetery is the only thing remaining in the community today and is located at the intersection of Farm to Market Roads 798 and 2985. An old oak tree in the community, named the "Indian Scout Tree", was the site of the last Native American battle in the county. It is located about 1-2 miles east of the former townsite.

Geography

Education
Children attended a local school called the Caesar School. Today, the community is served by the Pawnee Independent School District.

References

Unincorporated communities in Bee County, Texas
Unincorporated communities in Texas